M-3 is a north–south state trunkline highway in the Detroit metropolitan area of the US state of Michigan. For most of its length, the trunkline is known as Gratiot Avenue. The trunkline starts in Downtown Detroit and runs through the city in a northeasterly direction along one of Detroit's five major avenues. The highway passes several historic landmarks and through a historic district. It also connects residential neighborhoods on the city's east side with suburbs in Macomb County and downtown.

Gratiot Avenue in Detroit was one of the original avenues laid out by Judge Augustus Woodward after the Detroit fire in 1805. It was later used as a supply road for Fort Gratiot in Port Huron under authorization from the US Congress in the 1820s. The roadway was included in the State Trunkline Highway System in 1913 and signposted with a number in 1919. Later, it was used as a segment of US Highway 25 (US 25) before that highway was functionally replaced by Interstate 94 (I-94) in the 1960s. The M-3 designation was applied to the current highway in 1973, and a southern section was reassigned to M-85 in 2001.

Route description
The southern end of M-3 is at an intersection between Jefferson Avenue and Randolph Street near the near entrance to the Detroit–Windsor Tunnel, the Mariners' Church, and the Renaissance Center in downtown Detroit. This intersection also serves as the termini for M-10 and Business Spur I-375 (BS I-375). M-3 follows Randolph Street northward under the Detroit People Mover past Cadillac Square. North of Monroe Avenue, the street runs through the Randolph Street Commercial Buildings Historic District before M-3 crosses under the People Mover again and turns northeasterly along Gratiot Avenue, one of Detroit's five major thoroughfares. This street is a boulevard setup with four lanes divided with a median or center turn lane.

Gratiot Avenue runs northeasterly through downtown, past Ford Field. Near the stadium, the street passes over I-375 (Chrysler Freeway) without any direct connections. On the east side of the freeway, M-3 runs past the Historic Trinity Lutheran and St. John's-St. Luke's Evangelical churches before intersecting the end of the Fisher Freeway, which at this location is an unnumbered connector to I-75 and I-375. Gratiot continues past the freeway on the city's east side, bordering residential neighborhoods along the way. Through this area, it had a continuous center turn lane, losing the grassy median it had in places downtown. The highway intersects Grand Boulevard near Dueweke Park, and at Van Dyke Avenue, it intersects the southern end of M-53. Gratiot Avenue crosses I-94 at the latter's exit 219 near the Coleman A. Young International Airport and an adjacent industrial area.

Past the airport, Gratiot Avenue once again runs through residential neighborhoods while being immediately bordered by commercial properties. The southern end of M-97 is at the intersection between Gratiot and Gunston avenues just northeast of the Outer Drive junction by the airport. The trunkline passes the Assumption of the Blessed Virgin Mary Church near a branch location of the Detroit Public Library at McNichols Street. Just before crossing M-102 (8 Mile Road), Gratiot Avenue widens back to a boulevard. This intersection marks the transition from Detroit and Wayne County to Eastpointe in Macomb County.

In Macomb County, M-3 follows a boulevard setup complete with Michigan lefts at the major intersections in the suburbs of Detroit. There are a series of commercial properties between 10 Mile Road and I-696 (Reuther Freeway) that includes the Eastgate Shopping Center in Roseville. Near 13 Mile Road, there is a partial interchange with I-94 that allows eastbound traffic, which is physically traveling northbound to access northbound M-3 and southbound M-3 traffic to access westbound I-94. The missing connections are possible through the adjacent interchange for Little Mack Avenue on I-94 which also connects to 13 Mile Road and Gratiot Avenue. North of 14 Mile Road, M-3 crosses into Clinton Charter Township next to the Hebrew Memorial Park, a cemetery.

North of the intersection with Metropolitan Parkway, Gratiot Avenue splits into a one-way pairing of Northbound and Southbound Gratiot avenues as it crosses into Mount Clemens near the Clinton River. The two separate streets are one, two, or even three blocks apart through the city's downtown area. North of the Patterson Street intersections, the two streets cross back into Clinton Township and merge back together in four-lane street with a center turn lane. North of M-59 (Hall Road). M-3 clips the southeastern corner of Macomb Township near Selfridge Air National Guard Base. The highway continues into Chesterfield Township. M-3 parts from Gratiot Avenue at the intersection with 23 Mile Road, turning eastward along that roadway to an intersection with I-94. At exit 243, M-3 terminates at this interchange and 23 Mile Road continues easterly as M-29.

M-3 is maintained by the Michigan Department of Transportation (MDOT) like other state highways in Michigan. As a part of these maintenance responsibilities, the department tracks the volume of traffic that uses the roadways under its jurisdiction. These volumes are expressed using a metric called annual average daily traffic, which is a statistical calculation of the average daily number of vehicles on a segment of roadway. MDOT's surveys in 2010 showed that the highest traffic levels along M-3 were the 73,957 vehicles daily south of 14 Mile Road in Roseville; the lowest counts were the 4,609 vehicles per day north of Cadillac Square in downtown Detroit. All of M-3 has been listed on the National Highway System, a network of roads important to the country's economy, defense, and mobility.

History

Original designation

The first trunkline to be designated M-3 was Schaefer Highway in 1937, running north–south from US 25 (Dix Avenue) in Melvindale to US 16 (Grand River Avenue) in western Detroit. Two years later, the highway became M-39. Since M-39 was moved to Southfield Road in the end of the 1950s, Schaefer Highway has been a locally maintained road.

Current designation
The chief transportation routes in 1701 were the Indian trails that crossed the future state of Michigan; the one connecting what are now Detroit and Port Huron was one of these thirteen trails at the time. Detroit created  rights-of-way for the principal streets of the city, the modern Gratiot Avenue included, in 1805. This street plan was devised by Augustus Woodward and others following a devastating fire in Detroit. Gratiot Avenue, then also called Detroit–Port Huron Road, was authorized by the US Congress on March 2, 1827, as a supply road from Detroit to Port Huron for Fort Gratiot. Construction started in Detroit in 1829, and the roadway was completed in the same year to Mount Clemens. The rest was finished in 1833. The road was named for the fort near Port Huron, which was in turn named for Colonel Charles Gratiot, the supervising engineer in charge of construction of the structure in the aftermath of the War of 1812.

On May 13, 1913, the Michigan Legislature passed the State Reward Trunk Line Highway Act, which included Gratiot Avenue as part of Division 1 of the initial highway system. When the Michigan State Highway Department signposted  the first state highways in 1919, the trunkline bore the M-19 designation for its entire length from Detroit to Port Huron. In 1926, Gratiot Avenue was redesignated as part of US 25, while the M-19 designation was relocated westward, connecting Yale with US 25 (Gratiot Avenue) just north of 31 Mile Road. In 1963, the portion of US 25 north of 23 Mile Road was turned over to local control as US 25 was routed over the newly constructed I-94 freeway, with the exception of the stretch between New Haven and Muttonville, which was again designated M-19 as an extension of that route. Between Hall and 23 Mile roads, Gratiot Avenue was added to an extended M-59.

M-3 returned to existence in 1973, when US 25, now concurrent with I-94 and I-75 for most of its length through Michigan and Ohio, was truncated at Cincinnati. The former US 25 section of Gratiot Avenue was redesignated M-3, along with a southwestern extension down Fort Street to Clark Avenue (I-75 exit 47A). This also provided an international connection via the Ambassador Bridge to Ontario's Highway 3. The signs were changed over in February 1974 to complete the change. In 1998, the eastern end of M-59 was rerouted to end at I-94 exit 240, eliminating the concurrency from Hall Road to the current northern terminus of M-3.

At the end of 2000, MDOT proposed several highway transfers in Detroit, some of which involved transferring highways in the Campus Martius Park area to city control; another part of the proposal involved MDOT assuming control over a section of Fort Street from the then-northern terminus of M-85 to the then-southern terminus of M-3 at Clark Street. When these transfers were completed the following year, M-3 was severed into two discontinuous segments by the Campus Martius changes, and the southern segment between Clark and Griswold streets was added to an extended M-85.

Major intersections

See also

References

External links

M-3 at Michigan Highways

Dixie Highway
003
Transportation in Detroit
U.S. Route 25
Transportation in Wayne County, Michigan
Transportation in Macomb County, Michigan